Big Brother Australia 2012, also known as Big Brother 9, was the ninth season of the Australian reality television series, Big Brother. It was the first to air on the Nine Network who signed a deal with Southern Star Group in September 2011 to broadcast the show. The season began with a pre-recorded launch show on 13 August 2012. Benjamin Norris was announced the winner of the ninth season on 7 November 2012, making him the first openly gay person to win Big Brother Australia. Benjamin proposed to his boyfriend, also named Ben, during the show's finale.

This season introduced Sonia Kruger as the new host of Big Brother. Mike Goldman continued his role of providing voice over narration for the show. The production was based at the same compound, located within the Dreamworld theme park, that had been used in all previous series of Big Brother Australia.

Production
After four years off air, the Nine Network confirmed on 9 September 2011 that they had signed a contract with Southern Star Group to air the series in 2012; the first time a broadcaster other than Network Ten has broadcast the show in Australia. In September 2011, when the location of the Big Brother compound had not yet been officially confirmed, Queensland Premier Anna Bligh stated that she would do everything possible to see the show return to the Gold Coast. A spokesperson from Dreamworld, the original home of Big Brother, stated on 21 September 2011 that nothing was locked in but that the theme park would welcome the return of the show. In December 2011, The Daily Telegraph reported that Fox Studios Australia and Warner Bros. Movie World had also expressed interest. In an interview ahead of the season launch, Kruger suggested that Big Brother would be family friendly and air at 7.00 pm.

Several days after the news Big Brother was to return, Southern Star Group announced on their casting website that they would be accepting pre-audition applications for people who were interested in participating on the season. The official Facebook page for the show, as directed to by the Southern Star website, was opened on 15 September 2011. On 22 February 2012, it was officially announced that Big Brother would return to Dreamworld in 2012. Auditions began on 15 March, and took place in all major capital cities, as well as Gold Coast, in April and May 2012. More than twenty thousand people applied to be on the ninth season. The Official Big Brother Australia website reported that 14 housemates would be entering the house after going into lockdown on 4 August.

Format
Big Brother Australia is based on the international Big Brother series produced by Endemol in the Netherlands which began in 1999. The show's name comes from George Orwell's novel Nineteen Eighty-Four (1949), which revolves around a dystopia in which dictator Big Brother is the all-seeing leader. The series generally constitutes 14 or more contestants who live in an isolated house for several months. Housemates are at all times under the control of Big Brother, a rule enforcing authority figure who monitors behaviour of the housemates, sets tasks and punishments and provides the mechanism for contestants to make external requests. Each week, the housemates will cast votes to nominate two other housemates for eviction using five nomination points inside the Nominations Room. These points can be allocated however a housemate wishes (either 4 points to one housemate and 1 point to another; or 3 points to one and 2 points to another). Housemates are not permitted to discuss nominations. The three (or more in the case of a tie) housemates with the most nomination votes will be nominated. The viewers will then decide which of the nominees is evicted. This process continues until only one housemate remains to win the grand prize of $250,000.

This season each of the original fourteen housemates entered with a secret. The task in the first week was for the female housemates to match up the male housemates with their secrets. The secrets were that: one has the IQ of a genius (Michael), one became scared of birds after an emu attack (Bradley), one has been fired from every job he's ever had (Benjamin), one hasn't had a girlfriend since he was 11 (Ryan), one was a juvenile offender (Ray), one has dated more than 100 women (Josh), and one is a multimillionaire (George). The following week the girl's secrets were revealed for the male members of the house to solve. The secrets were that: one had Obsessive Compulsive Disorder (Charne), one was a champion weightlifter (Angie), one is a high school dropout (Estelle), one was a nude protester (Sarah), one used to be an emo (Zoe), one was a hand model (Stacey) and that one is a member of a royal family (Layla).

The House
The purpose-built house was located at Dreamworld on the Gold Coast, Australia.

Rooms/Areas in the house included:

 Diary Room
 Nominations Room 
 HMAS BB/ "Captain's Quarters" (the Rewards Room) –  Housemates were granted access to "The Captain's Quarters" along with a sauna and a pool as a reward for winning the "Captain's Challenge". They were able to invite along one housemate of their choice.
 Backyard
 Living room 
 Kitchen/dining area
 The utility room, a regularly renovated room that has been used as six separate rooms:
 The parlour
 The man-cave
 A cafe
 A Switzerland-style room.
 Also, the hallway to the utility room was used as part of "The Factory" task.
 A zen temple
 Bedroom, along with storage shelves to store the housemates' possessions
 Bathroom
 Secret executive bathroom, accessed via a secret door in the bedroom disguised as a shelf
 Gym and fitness area
 "The Naughty Corner" –  A small room that housemates were sent to if they had broken the house rules (such as excessive swearing or talking without a microphone). Fellow housemates were able to see into the room via a window that could change from being opaque to transparent. On Day 71, Estelle was called the nicest housemate, and thus got to go into the revamped corner, now called 'The Nice Corner.' 
 Outdoor entertainment complex/outdoor pizza oven

The house contained rolling cameras hidden behind one-way mirrors which had been situated around the house walls. This was done so that camera operators did not roll cameras around the house.

Housemates
On launch night, ten housemates (seven women and three men) entered the house on Day 0. The seven women first entered through a room called the parlour for a secret task, but later entered the house. Two more male housemates entered the house on Day 2, two via a live special, and two more revealed on the next day's show. After Week 5's and Week 6's nominations, a female and male intruder entered the house. Ava entered on Day 29, and Sam entered on Day 36. Unlike the original fourteen housemates, no intruders are keeping a secret in the house.

Weekly summary and highlights

Josh's departure
On Day 59, Josh was called to the Captains Quarters, where he was taken out of the house to see his parents. They told him of the sudden death of his only sibling, Toby. Josh spent the night outside of the house, where he made the decision to stay with his family and not return to the house.
On Day 60, housemates were informed of the situation, and said their goodbyes in the early hours of Day 60. Out of respect for Josh and his family, Big Brother turned the cameras off for these goodbyes. As a result of Josh leaving, voting lines for eviction were closed—with any votes cast prior being invalidated—and the funds donated to the Salvation Army; a choice by Josh and his family. Also, the weekly challenge was ended prematurely and live feeds from the official website were paused. The upcoming eviction was also canceled, instead replaced with Josh's return to say thank you to the public for their support which was followed by the routinely used 'highlights' show.

Nominations table
This series, housemates were allowed to distribute five nomination points between their two nominations, with a maximum of four points to be allocated to one housemate. The three or more housemates with the most votes face the public vote to save. In addition, nominations are now held in a sound-proof chamber inside a Nominations Room, as opposed to the Diary Room.

Nominations Super Power
From Week 4 to Week 11, the Nominations Super Power was as a weekly twist to nominations. It was a special secret power given to a chosen housemate by a previous week's evictee. The Nominations Super Power gives an advantage to one housemate for nominations in a given week. The most recent evictee decides on which housemate they would like to have the power, without knowing what that power is.
 In Week 4's nominations, Estelle was able to view the current nominations tally as it stood before she cast her vote.
 In Week 5's nominations, Benjamin was given two sets of five nomination points to distribute for the week, giving him the power to distribute ten points over four housemates.
 In Week 6's nominations, George was given the right to view the nominations tally board as the housemates nominated, and saw the points distributed on the board as they changed and swapped. He was also given the right to select one housemate of his choice and get rid of the nomination. The two people they nominated points were removed from the board
 In Week 7's nominations, Layla was only permitted to give one nomination (for 6 points) but it could be for any reason at all.
 In Week 8's nominations, Estelle was given the opportunity to listen in on the nominations of two housemates, thus influencing her subsequent nominations.
 In Week 9's nominations, Josh was given the opportunity to win up to 16 nomination points to nominate as many housemates as he wished; he had to guess who each housemate would nominate and for every correct guess he would receive one point.
 In Week 10's nominations, Michael was given the opportunity to select someone's nominations, cancel them out and replace them with exactly the same as his.
 In Week 11, Layla was the Final Housemate to nominate and was able to view the nominations tally before she voted. Additionally, she had full control over her points (whether to nominate regularly in a 3/2 or 4/1 vote allocation, or just one person with all 5 points). Additionally, she was able to talk with her father (as the "Open House" task did not apply to the Diary Room, where she cast her vote) who could give Layla advice about her nominations.

Note:  The housemate holding the superpower, each week it was in play, is marked in green.

Notes

:  The female housemates were set a secret task to potentially earn immunity for the second week. They had to match up the seven given secrets to the seven male housemates who entered the house throughout the week. If all seven secrets were correctly matched to the correct male, all the female housemates would be immune. The females failed to match up the secrets, and therefore were the only ones who could be nominated in Week 2.
:  Right after the reveal of the males' secrets, the male housemates were set a secret task to potentially earn immunity for the third week. They were to match up seven given secrets to the seven female housemates throughout the week. If all seven secrets were correctly matched to the correct female, all the male housemates would be immune for the second straight week. On the night of the first live eviction, the males failed the task, making the females immune for the third week in the Big Brother house.
: Because of scheduling conflicts with the network's airing of the NRL Grand Final, Week 7's eviction took place on Day 51 instead of Day 49.
: This week's nominations contained a compulsory strategic vote, in which one nomination from each housemate had to be for strategic reasons. In addition, Big Brother set a new rule: housemates were no longer allowed to cover their mouths while in the Chamber; Big Brother would force them to open the Chamber door and state their nominations for everyone to hear if this rule was broken.
: Josh walked out of the Big Brother House on Day 60 due to a personal emergency. After his departure, voting lines were terminated – with the funds from the votes going to a charity of Josh's choice – and the eviction was canceled. The eviction was replaced with a live special celebrating Josh's time in the House. The Housemates nominated for the cancelled eviction (Angie, Estelle and Sam) remained nominated for the next eviction, with a new round of Nomination Voting adding at least three more nominees for eviction (between Michael, Benjamin, Zoe, Stacey and Layla).
:  Week 11's nominations were the final nominations of the season. However, friends and family of the housemates – who entered the house as part of the "Open House" task – would perform the second nomination, nominating with one point, whereas the housemate themselves (apart from Layla, per her Nomination Super Power) had to nominate one housemate for four points. They were separated during the nominations process, with the relatives sitting in the lounge and called into the nominations room (and chamber) after their housemate had voted. Housemates sat in the nominations room as normal, and were instructed to "ignore" their loved one upon their entry, lest they risk failing their weekly shopping task.
: Following Week 11's eviction on Day 77, the public began voting for the winner. On Day 84, the lines froze for a vote reading; having garnered the fewest votes to win, Sam was evicted. In a twist, Big Brother revealed the percentage of "win" votes each housemate garnered, so as to give viewers a hint as to who may win and who may be evicted. On Day 85, the first and only double eviction of the season took place; Zoe and Michael were evicted, having garnered the fewest votes to win.

Special shows
Throughout the series, some of the shows aired as specials; apart from the launch, daily shows, nomination shows, eviction shows, and the final.

Live Special
"Live Special" was a live daily show that was broadcast on Day 2 in which the final four male housemates entered the House. Two were revealed live (George and Ryan), and two were revealed on the next day's daily show.

A second Live Special was broadcast on Day 63 to replace what was supposed to be the eighth eviction of the season, but was cancelled due to the sudden departure of housemate Josh on Day 60. Along with the regular highlights from the past few days, there was also clips reminiscing about Josh's time in the house.

The New Housemates
"The New Housemates" was a live daily show that was broadcast on Day 3

Secrets Revealed Live
"Secrets Revealed Live" was a live show that was broadcast on Day 7. The parlour twist was revealed to all the housemates, and the female housemates had to correctly match all the males' secrets without failing four times. The females failed to match the final secrets belonging to Benjamin and George, and so the females were to risk being nominated for Week 2. After the task, the male housemates were set the same task for the new week, and began to evaluate the females' secrets in the renovated parlour called the man cave.

Live Nominations 4 / Intruder Alert
The "4th Live Nominations" was the nomination and intruder special that was broadcast on Day 29.

Intruder Incoming
"Intruder Incoming" was a live daily show that was broadcast on Day 37

Live Josh Special
"Live Josh Special" was a live special where instead of an eviction that was broadcast on Day 63.

Little Sister Special
 "Big Brother's Little Sister" were two special episodes broadcast on Day 65 and 79 where Big Brother's "Little Sister" asked the housemates questions sent in by the viewers.

Big Secrets
 "Big Secrets" was a live daily show that was broadcast on Day 78

Ratings
The launch ratings for this season were up significantly from 2008 as the opening night show reached 2.1 million viewers at its peak and averaged at 1.6 million viewers, the franchise's highest ratings since the 2003 series.

Ratings are rounded to the nearest ten thousand. Shows on GO! are not included in official averages. Figures in bold include consolidated viewing figures.

References

External links
Official website

2012 Australian television seasons
09